Sharntelle Sharon Tamika Cyren McLean (born June 1, 1984) is a 2-time Olympic swimmer from Trinidad and Tobago. She swam for Trinidad and Tobago at the 2004 and 2008 Olympics. Beginning in 2005, she has attended and swam for the United States' University of South Carolina.

In January 2009, she and George Bovell were named the Female and Male Swimmer of the Year for 2008 by Trinidad & Tobago's national swimming federation: the Amateur Swimming Association of Trinidad and Tobago (ASATT). She has received the honor two times before in 2003 and 2004.

She has swum internationally for T&T at the:
2002 Commonwealth Games
2002 Short Course Worlds
2002 Central American and Caribbean Games
2003 Pan American Games
2003 World Championships
2004 Olympics
2006 Central American and Caribbean Games
2007 World Championships
2008 Olympics

References

1984 births
Living people
Swimmers at the 2002 Commonwealth Games
Swimmers at the 2003 Pan American Games
Swimmers at the 2004 Summer Olympics
Swimmers at the 2008 Summer Olympics
Olympic swimmers of Trinidad and Tobago
Pan American Games competitors for Trinidad and Tobago
Commonwealth Games competitors for Trinidad and Tobago
Trinidad and Tobago female swimmers
South Carolina Gamecocks women's swimmers
University of South Carolina alumni
Central American and Caribbean Games silver medalists for Trinidad and Tobago
Central American and Caribbean Games bronze medalists for Trinidad and Tobago
Competitors at the 2002 Central American and Caribbean Games
Competitors at the 2006 Central American and Caribbean Games
Central American and Caribbean Games medalists in swimming